Thou Swell is a ballet created by New York City Ballet's balletmaster-in-chief Peter Martins to the songs of Richard Rodgers in an arrangement by Glen Kelly with orchestrations Don Sebesky. 

The music is performed by an on stage trio and two singers. During the course of the ballet one of the male dancers (Nilas Martins in the original cast) "sits in" at the piano. The premiere took place on 22 January 2003 at the New York State Theater, Lincoln Center, with scenery by Robin Wagner, costumes by Julius Lumsden, supervised by Holly Hynes, and lighting by Mark Stanley.

Featured songs
(Song used and date of composition):

"Where or When" (1937)
"Manhattan" (1925)
"Mountain Greenery" (1926)
"My Heart Stood Still" (1927)
"This Can't Be Love" (1938)
"Bewitched, Bothered and Bewildered" (1940)
"The Lady Is a Tramp" (1937)
"Blue Moon" (1934)
"Getting to Know You" (1951)
"Lover" (1932)
"The Most Beautiful Girl in the World" (1935)
"With a Song in My Heart" (1929)
"Isn't It Romantic?" (1932),
"You Took Advantage of Me" (1928)
"Thou Swell" (1927)
"Falling in Love with Love" (1938)

Original cast

Maria Kowroski
Yvonne Borree
Rachel Rutherford
Darci Kistler
Charles Askegard
Nilas Martins
James Fayette
Jock Soto

References 
 Playbill, New York City Ballet, Thursday, June 19, 2008
 Repertory Week, New York City Ballet, Spring Season, 2008 repertory, week 8

Reviews 
NY Times review by Anna Kisselgoff, November 28, 2002
NY Times review by Alastair Macaulay, June 10, 2008

Ballets by Peter Martins
New York City Ballet repertory
2003 ballet premieres
Ballets to the music of Richard Rodgers
Ballets designed by Robin Wagner
Ballets designed by Julius Lumsden